Crassuncus is a genus of moths in the family Pterophoridae.

Species
Crassuncus colubratus  (Meyrick, 1909)
Crassuncus defectus (Bigot & Luquet, 1991)
Crassuncus livingstoni  Kovtunovich & Ustjuzhanin, 2014
Crassuncus orophilus Gibeaux, 1994
Crassuncus pacifica  (Meyrick, 1911)
Crassuncus pseudolaudatus (Gibeaux, 1992)
Crassuncus timidus (Meyrick, 1908)
Crassuncus ecstaticus (Meyrick, 1932)

References
Kovtunovich, Ustejuzhanin & Murphy, 2014.Plume moths of Malawi (Lepidoptera: Pterophoridae). Zootaxa 3847 (4): 451–494 (11 Aug. 2014)(abstract)

Oidaematophorini
Moth genera